Behold My Wife! is a lost 1920 American silent drama film directed by George Melford and starring Mabel Julienne Scott and Milton Sills in a filmization of Sir Gilbert Parker's novel, The Translation of a Savage.
Famous Players-Lasky produced the film and Paramount Pictures distributed.

In 1934, the story was filmed again by Paramount as Behold My Wife, directed by Mitchell Leisen and starring Sylvia Sidney and Gene Raymond.

Plot
As described in a film magazine, Frank Armour, scion of British aristocracy and of the Hudson's Bay Company, hears from his former sweetheart of her marriage to a rival. In revenge and to ridicule his family, he marries an Indian princess Lali. Sending her to his family home in England, he then plunges into the Canadian wilderness and into a life of dissolution. Through the kindness of the Armour family and especially through the patience and perseverance of Frank's brother Richard, Lili is transformed into a beautiful and charming society woman. Lali's happiness receives a blow when Frank's former sweetheart tells her the reason that he had married her. Lali's loyalty and love for Frank remain steadfast through the years until his redemption and return to the family home to find their boy.

Cast

Mabel Julienne Scott as Lali, Indian girl
Milton Sills as Frank Armour
Winter Hall as General Armour
Elliott Dexter as Richard Armour
Helen Dunbar as Mrs. Armour
Ann Forrest as Marion Armour
Maude Wayne as Julia Haldwell
Fred Huntley as Chief Eye-of-the-Moon (credited as Fred Huntly)
Frank Butler as Captain Vidal (credited as F.R. Butler)
Templar Powell as Lord Haldwell (credited as F. Templer-Powell)
Mark Fenton as Gordon
Jane Wolfe as Mrs. McKenzie

References

External links

Newspaper advert with likeness of Mabel Julienne Scott

American silent feature films
Films directed by George Melford
Films based on Canadian novels
Films based on works by Gilbert Parker
Paramount Pictures films
Lost American films
Silent American drama films
1920 drama films
American black-and-white films
1920 lost films
Lost drama films
1920s American films
1920s English-language films